Tangwang County is a county in Heilongjiang Province, China. It is under the administration of the prefecture-level city of Yichun. The county was established by merging the former Wuyiling District and Tangwanghe District approved by Chinese State Council in 2019. The county seat is Henan Subdistrict.

Administrative divisions 
Tangwang County is divided into 9 areas, and 1 subdistrict. 
9 areas
 Xing'an  Shequ, Wenhua  Shequ, Zhenxing  Shequ, Nanshan  Shequ, Xiangyang  Shequ, Xingfu  Shequ, Xinfeng  Shequ, Jianshe  Shequ, Lintie  Shequ 
1 subdistrict  
 Xiangyang  Shequ

References

Yichun